Joshua Ravetch is an American playwright, screenwriter and stage director born in Los Angeles, California, who co-created and directed Carrie Fisher's one-woman show Wishful Drinking, which had a successful run on Broadway. He also co-wrote and directed Dick Van Dyke in his first-ever one man show, Step in Time! A Musical Memoir, which premiered at The Geffen Playhouse.

Career

Ravetch's award-winning play, Chasing Mem'ries: A Different Kind of Musical received the Edgerton New Play Award and was nominated for the Ovation. The play starred Tyne Daly and Robert Forster and world premiered at The Geffen Playhouse in 2017. Ravetch collaborated with lyricists Alan and Marilyn Bergman with music by Marvin Hamlisch, Michel Legrand and Johnny Mandel.

Ravetch also wrote and directed The Astronomer, which was performed at The Pasadena Playhouse with Academy Award winner Shirley Jones in the title role (after receiving a workshop production at the NoHo Arts Center Theatre). The play came on the heels of the whimsical project Ravetch co-wrote with stage and screen icon Dick Van Dyke, Step in Time! A Musical Memoir. Ravetch directed the world premiere production of the play at The Geffen Playhouse with Van Dyke starring.

Perhaps Ravetch is most known for collaborated with actress/writer Carrie Fisher, and co-creating and directing her in Wishful Drinking, Fisher's one-woman-show at Los Angeles' Geffen Playhouse. It enjoyed an extended run on Broadway at Studio 54 and was adapted into a special for HBO.

Also at The Geffen Playhouse, Ravetch wrote and directed a workshop production of Writer's Cramp with Oscar nominee Robert Forster, Emmy winner and Tony nominee Holland Taylor, and Tony nominee Douglas Sills. Other writing credits include Periscope Up a play in one act which was performed at the NoHo Arts Theatre and was directed by Star Trek veteran Jonathan Frakes.

Ravetch also directed Clifford Odets' The Big Knife; Thomas Babe's Prayer For My Daughter; John Patrick's Hasty Heart and Ira Levin's Deathtrap which garnered five Drama-Logue Awards including awards for Director and Production.

Ravetch's other playwriting credits include Girders at Los Angeles' Coast Playhouse starring Robert Forster, which won the coveted Odets Award. Forster also starred in workshop productions of Ravetch's plays Off Sides with Olympia Dukakis and Beacon with Brooke Shields.

His other plays include Invention with Stefanie Powers at the NoHo Arts Center, and he co-wrote One From the Hart, Powers' one-woman show which opened at the Orange County Performing Arts Centre. Also at The Coast Playhouse, Ravetch directed Bart Baker's play, Love Acts, with actress/supermodel Beverly Johnson. Johnson was nominated for the NAACP Image award for her performance.

Ravetch's television credits include CBS' Joan of Arcadia, Titan for TNT, Horseshoe Bay for Warner Brothers, and Yesterday for Laura Ziskin Productions.

Stage

References

American dramatists and playwrights
Living people
Year of birth missing (living people)